Squalus philippinus is an invalid scientific name for two species:

 Port Jackson shark, Squalus philippinus Shaw, 1804 is a junior synonym to its accepted scientific name Heterodontus portusjacksoni
 Philippines spurdog, Squalus philippinus Smith and Radcliffe 1912 is a junior synonym to its accepted scientific name Squalus montalbani